Central Michigan Chippewas basketball may refer to either of the basketball teams that represent Central Michigan University:

Central Michigan Chippewas men's basketball
Central Michigan Chippewas women's basketball